The following is a list of squads for each nation competing in football 5-a-side at the 2020 Summer Paralympics in Tokyo.

Group A

Brazil

China

France

Japan

Group B

Argentina

Morocco

Spain

Thailand

References

Squads
Paralympic association football squads